Khodr Bechara (born 13 April 1965) is a Lebanese wrestler. He competed in the men's Greco-Roman 130 kg at the 1988 Summer Olympics.

References

External links
 

1965 births
Living people
Lebanese male sport wrestlers
Olympic wrestlers of Lebanon
Wrestlers at the 1988 Summer Olympics
Place of birth missing (living people)
Wrestlers at the 1990 Asian Games
Asian Games competitors for Lebanon